The Precor USA  StretchTrainer is a piece of exercise equipment used to improve flexibility, coordination and  athletic performance.  The seated design ensures that users are kept in the correct position to stretch muscle groups.

Overview
The machine is designed to incorporate stretching into the exercises; it takes about ten minutes to complete a workout.  Stretching is beneficial when warming up or cooling down from a workout; not only does stretching muscles help prevent injury during exercise, but increased flexibility is one of the health-related components of physical fitness. 
The StretchTrainer has been engineered to be lightweight with a small footprint so that it fits into a home gym or fitness center.  The seated design helps stabilize the back during stretching movements.

Mechanics
The StretchTrainer works by using the exerciser's own weight to stretch the major muscle groups.  The user sits on the cushioned seat with their knees placed on the kneepad and hold the padded handlebars in front.  The design ensures the correct stretching position to keep the spine aligned and prevent any straining.

The machine is constructed of steel frame that can support users up to 250 pounds and accommodate exercisers of any height.  The tilting seat leans back and forth on a self-lubricated pivot point. As a safety feature, the StretchTrainer has two polyester wrists straps attached to the handlebars so that when used properly, if the user loses grip, they will not fall back out of the seat and onto the floor.

Usage

The StretchTrainer comes with an attached placard with instructions and graphics showing the user the eight essential stretches to target key muscle groups:
 Lower back
 Hamstrings
 Gluteal/hips
 Hips/legs/back
 Inner thighs/Groin
 Upper back
 Shoulders
 Quadriceps

By placing the legs in the indicated position, gripping the handlebars as shown, and tilting slowly backwards, the user will be able to  stretch each of the muscle groups.

Physical benefits
Stretching is an exercise that leads to increased muscle control, flexibility, range of motion, circulation, and overall fitness level.

An active stretching regimen can strengthen muscles because stretching affects muscles in a way similar to strength training, just on a smaller scale.  A stretching regimen has been shown to increase weight-lifting abilities, improve endurance, and assist in plyometrics.  Research shows that StretchTrainer users can increase their flexibility (as judged by a basic sit and reach test) after 30 days of use, regardless of age.

The design of the StretchTrainer makes sure that the body and joints are kept in line, and because the machine's tension is actually the user's own weight, it is virtually impossible to hyperextend any muscles.

References

Exercise equipment